Amy Florence Augarde (7 July 1868 – 1 April 1959) was an English actress and singer in musical theatre and operetta.

Born at Westminster, Augarde was a member of a musical family. Among her siblings, Louise Adele Augarde (later King, 1863–1909) was a contralto with the D'Oyly Carte Opera Company, Frank Wells Augarde was a violinist, John Vernham Augarde was organist of St Paul's Church, Knightsbridge, and Augustus Wells Augarde was a clarinet player in the London Symphony Orchestra. Augarde was the aunt of Adrienne Augarde.

Augarde first appeared on stage in 1884, when she was fifteen, winning a place in the chorus of one of Richard D'Oyly Carte's British touring companies. In 1885 and 1886 she was in the United States with Carte's American company playing The Mikado, and then joined the chorus of his tour of Germany and Austria. In 1887 she was back in the US with Carte's American company playing Ruddigore, usually in the chorus, but sometimes playing the small role of Ruth. Later that year she was the understudy to Jessie Bond for the role of Mad Margaret in Ruddigore in London's Savoy Theatre and playing the role in September. In January 1888 she was cast as Hebe in the first revival of H.M.S. Pinafore.

Later in 1888 Augarde played Lydia Hawthorne in the long-running comic opera Dorothy at the Lyric Theatre, and the next year originated the part of Lady Anne Jerningham in Doris, also at the Lyric. She went on to appear in many successful musicals and operettas, including long runs in The Little Michus (1905 to 1906), The Chocolate Soldier (1910 to 1911), Shell Out (1915 to 1916), Nobody's Boy (1919), and The Naughty Princess (1920 to 1921). In 1925 she played Luisa in Franz Lehar's Frasquita. In 1935 she was Dancing Sunbeam in a revival of The Rose of Persia.

Augarde was also a successful gramophone recording artist.

She died in Reigate, Surrey, at the age of 90.

Notes

References
Sardeson, Sandra M. A. Born to Music, the Story of the Augarde Family in England (Heritage Lincolnshire, 1999)

External links
Amy Augarde at National Portrait Gallery, London
Miss Amy Augarde as Mdlle Lange in La Fille de Madame Angot at lookandlearn.com

1868 births
1959 deaths
Actresses from London
English stage actresses
People from Westminster
19th-century English actresses
20th-century English actresses
19th-century English singers
20th-century English women singers
20th-century English singers